Henri-Gédéon Malhiot (March 22, 1840 – October 20, 1909) was a politician from Quebec, Canada.

Background

He was born on March 22, 1840 in Saint-Pierre-les-Becquets, Centre-du-Quebec.  He was a lawyer.  He was married to Élizabeth-Eugénie Labarre in 1865 and to Louise Olivier in 1884.

Provincial Politics

He ran as a Liberal candidate in the district of Nicolet in 1867 and as a Conservative candidate in the district of Trois-Rivières in an 1869 by-election.  Each time he lost.

He was elected in 1871.  He resigned from his seat to accept a position as Minister for Crown Lands in Premier Boucher de Boucherville's Cabinet.  He was re-elected in an 1874 by-election and in a 1875 general election.

He also served as the Government House Leader from 1874 to 1876.  He resigned in 1876.

Federal Politics

He ran as a Conservative candidate in the district of Trois-Rivières in 1878, but lost.

Mayor of Trois-Rivières

Malhiot served as Mayor of Trois-Rivières from 1885 to 1888.

Death

He died on October 20, 1909.

References

1840 births
1909 deaths
Conservative Party of Quebec MNAs
Mayors of Trois-Rivières